Mahamane Saley is a Nigerien politician. He has been a member of the Pan-African Parliament for Niger since first being appointed in 1999.

Further reading

References

Year of birth missing (living people)
Living people
Members of the Pan-African Parliament from Niger